Tanacetum microphyllum is a species of flowering plant in the aster family, Asteraceae. It is endemic to the Iberian Peninsula.

The plant has been used for centuries in Spanish traditional medicine as an anti-inflammatory and antirheumatic. Compounds isolated from extracts of the plant include santin, ermanin, centaureidin, and hydroxyachillin.

References

microphyllum
Flora of Portugal
Flora of Spain
Plants described in 1838
Medicinal plants of Europe
Endemic flora of the Iberian Peninsula